Kaohsiung Municipal Sanmin Senior High School, alias Sanmin Senior High School is a high school located in Sanmin District, Kaohsiung City, Taiwan, known for its baseball team.

It encourages students to be modest, kind, pure, honest when living alone, treating others, improving selves, addressing matters respectively, which is what they calls as "Sanmin Spirit".

See also
Education in Taiwan

References

1996 establishments in Taiwan
Educational institutions established in 1996
High schools in Taiwan
Schools in Kaohsiung